Gruben Church is a parish church of the Church of Norway in Rana Municipality in Nordland county, Norway.  It is located in the eastern part of the town of Mo i Rana. It is the church for the Gruben parish which is part of the Indre Helgeland prosti (deanery) in the Diocese of Sør-Hålogaland. The white, concrete church was built in a long church style in 1965 using plans drawn up by the architect Nils Toft. The church seats about 550 people.

See also
List of churches in Sør-Hålogaland

References

Rana, Norway
Churches in Nordland
20th-century Church of Norway church buildings
Churches completed in 1965
1965 establishments in Norway
Long churches in Norway
Concrete churches in Norway